The Evening Telegraph was a daily newspaper published between 1901 and 1921 in Charters Towers, Queensland, Australia.

Digitisation 
The paper has been digitised as part of the Australian Newspapers Digitisation Program  of the National Library of Australia.

References

External links
 

Evening Telegraph
Newspapers established in 1901
1901 establishments in Australia
1921 disestablishments in Australia
Publications disestablished in 1921
Charters Towers
Daily newspapers published in Australia